Zambra is a village in Tuscany, central Italy, administratively a frazione of the comune of Cascina, province of Pisa.

Zambra is about 12 km from Pisa and 7 km from Cascina, located alongside the river Arno.
The village shares its name with a little stream flowing down from Calci into the Arno.

References

Bibliography 
 

Frazioni of the Province of Pisa